Reynolds Field may refer to:

Reynolds Field (Northwestern), a multi-purpose stadium at Northwestern College, Minnesota
Jackson County Airport (Michigan), Jackson, Michigan